Vladyslav Panko (born 16 February 2002 in Chernihiv) is a Ukrainian professional footballer who plays as a midfielder.

Player career
In 2019, he started his career at SDYuShOR Desna and then moved to Desna-3 Chernihiv, the youth academy and reserve squad of Desna Chernihiv, where he played 27 matches and scored 3 goals.

FC Chernihiv
In summer 2022, he signed for FC Chernihiv in the Ukrainian First League. On 15 October, he made his debut against Skoruk Tomakivka. On 3 March 2023 he ended his contract with the club by mutual agreement.

Career statistics

Club

References

External links
 Vladyslav Panko at FC Chernihiv 
 Vladyslav Panko at upl.ua 

2002 births
Living people
Footballers from Chernihiv
SDYuShOR Desna players
FC Desna-3 Chernihiv players
FC Chernihiv players
FC Kudrivka players
Ukrainian footballers
Association football midfielders
Ukrainian First League players